Iga Świątek defeated Anett Kontaveit in the final, 6–2, 6–0 to win the singles title at the 2022 Qatar Open. This tournament marked the beginning of an eventual 37-match and six-title winning streak by Świątek.

Petra Kvitová was the defending champion, but she retired from her second round match against Elise Mertens.

Seeds 
The top eight seeds received a bye into the second round.

Draw

Finals

Top half

Section 1

Section 2

Bottom half

Section 3

Section 4

Qualifying

Seeds

Qualifiers

Lucky losers

Qualifying draw

First qualifier

Second qualifier

Third qualifier

Fourth qualifier

Fifth qualifier

Sixth qualifier

Seventh qualifier

Eighth qualifier

References

External links 
Main draw
Qualifying draw

2022 Qatar Total Open - 1
2022 WTA Tour